EFOSMO is an abbreviation for encoderless full  observer order mode of sliding . 
It is used to estimate the not measurable  variables in  drive implement the encoderless control method.

In model-based observer methods, mostly the estimated speed is a necessary feedback for the observer, such as Model Reference Adaptive System (MRAS) and Full order Sliding mode observer (FOSMO). Usually, the speed calculation is the last step of the estimation, which means the cumulative estimation error will be injected into the observer. To reduce the influence of the estimated speed, an EFOSMO is proposed. By considering the observer in a 'DQ' frame, the observer does not need the results  of the calculated speed anymore, which means the erratic injection by the calculated speed is removed from the observation system.

References 

Electric motors